Mazayjan or Mazayejan may refer to:
 Mazayjan, Bavanat
 Mazayjan, Zarrin Dasht
 Mazayjan Rural District, in Bavanat County